Larka is a surname. Notable people with the surname include:

Andres Larka (1879–1943), Estonian military commander
Karl Lärka (1892–1981), Swedish documentary photographer

See also
Larkas